Hóquei Académico de Cambra (HAC) is a rink hockey club from Vale de Cambra, Portugal. Its senior team participates in the Portuguese Roller Hockey First Division.

Honours
Portuguese Cup: 1
2006–07

External links
 Official Site (Portuguese)

Rink hockey clubs in Portugal
Vale de Cambra